Dame Karen Margaret Sewell  (born ) is a New Zealand educator and public servant. In the 2012 New Year Honours, she was appointed a Companion of the Queen's Service Order, for services to the State, and in the 2016 Queen's Birthday Honours, she was appointed a Dame Companion of the New Zealand Order of Merit, for services to education.

References

1940s births
Year of birth missing (living people)
Living people
New Zealand schoolteachers
New Zealand public servants
Companions of the Queen's Service Order
Dames Companion of the New Zealand Order of Merit